Phulwariwa is a village in West Champaran district in the Indian state of Bihar.

Demographics
As of 2011 India census, Phulwariwa had a population of 2385 in 532 households. Males constitute 51.4% of the population and females 48.5%. Phulwariwa has an average literacy rate of 34%, lower than the national average of 74%: male literacy is 64.2%, and female literacy is 35.7%. In Phulwariwa, 25.3% of the population is under 6 years of age.

References

Villages in West Champaran district